Mike Lipari (18 December 1932 – 20 April 2012) was a Canadian weightlifter. He competed in the men's light heavyweight event at the 1960 Summer Olympics.

References

1932 births
2012 deaths
Canadian male weightlifters
Olympic weightlifters of Canada
Weightlifters at the 1960 Summer Olympics
Sportspeople from Montreal
Pan American Games medalists in weightlifting
Pan American Games bronze medalists for Canada
Weightlifters at the 1963 Pan American Games
20th-century Canadian people
21st-century Canadian people